Santi Giovanni e Paolo (Italian, 'John and Paul') may refer to:

 Santi Giovanni e Paolo al Celio, an ancient basilica church in Rome, Italy
 Santi Giovanni e Paolo, Venice, or San Zanipolo, a church in Venice, Italy
 Teatro Santi Giovanni e Paolo, a theater and opera house in Venice, Italy, 1638–1715
 Ferentino Cathedral (Basilica Cattedrale dei Santi Giovanni e Paolo), in Ferentino, Lazio, Italy

See also
 John and Paul (disambiguation)